The A29 motorway is a motorway in the Netherlands. It is approximately 31 kilometres long. The A29 is located in the Dutch provinces South Holland and North Brabant.

There are no European routes that are part of the A29 motorway.

Section Klaaswaal-Dinteloord 

The section between the planned interchange Klaaswaal and the southern terminus, near Dinteloord, is officially a part of Rijksweg number 4. However, until that road's missing link between Rotterdam (at interchange Benelux) and Klaaswaal has been constructed, the section Klaaswaal-Dinteloord will be referred to as A29, to avoid confusion.

Exit list

External links

Motorways in the Netherlands
Motorways in North Brabant
Motorways in South Holland
Transport in Moerdijk
Transport in Rotterdam
Barendrecht
Goeree-Overflakkee
Hoeksche Waard